Juozas Bagdonas  (11 December 1911 in Antrieji Vydeikiai, Kovno Governorate – 11 April 2005 in Plungė) was a Lithuanian painter and founder of the Samogitian Museum of Art.

References
Universal Lithuanian Encyclopedia

1911 births
2005 deaths
People from Plungė District Municipality
People from Kovno Governorate
20th-century Lithuanian painters
Soviet painters